Bommireddy Sundara Rami Reddy  (17 October 1935 – 6 February 2020) was an Indian physician and politician from Andhra Pradesh belonging to Indian National Congress. He was elected thrice as a legislator of the Andhra Pradesh Legislative Assembly.

Biography
Rami Reddy was born on 17 October 1935. He received his MBBS degree from Chennai. Later, he joined government service. He opened his clinic in 1970.

Rami Reddy was elected as a legislator of the  Andhra Pradesh Legislative Assembly from Atmakur in 1978. He was also elected from that constituency in 1985 and 1989. In 1985 he beat Venkaiah Naidu in the election. His son Bommireddy Raghavendra Reddy is a former member of the Andhra Pradesh Legislative Council.

Rami Reddy died on 6 February 2020 at the age of 84.

References

1935 births
2020 deaths
Indian National Congress politicians from Andhra Pradesh
Andhra Pradesh MLAs 1978–1983
Andhra Pradesh MLAs 1985–1989
Andhra Pradesh MLAs 1989–1994
Medical doctors from Andhra Pradesh
People from Kurnool district